Apterocyclus waterhousei is a species of stag beetle in the family Lucanidae. The rare, flightless beetle is found only on the island of Kauai in the Hawaiian Islands. It has been reported in several locations on the island in recent years.

References

Further reading

External links

 

Lucaninae
Beetles of Oceania
Insects of Hawaii
Endemic fauna of Hawaii
Beetles described in 1908